Eriochrome Black T is a complexometric indicator that is used in complexometric titrations, e.g. in the water hardness determination process. It is an azo dye. Eriochrome is a trademark of Huntsman Petrochemical, LLC.

In its deprotonated form, Eriochrome Black T is blue. It turns red when it forms a complex with calcium, magnesium, or other metal ions.

Applications

When used as an indicator in an EDTA titration, the characteristic blue end-point is reached when sufficient EDTA is added and the metal ions bound to the indicator are chelated by EDTA, leaving the free indicator molecule.

Eriochrome Black T has also been used to detect the presence of rare earth metals.

References

External links
 J.T. Baker MSDS
 Describes a procedure for determining the hardness of water using EDTA with Eriochrome indicator

Complexometric indicators
Titration

Analytical chemistry
Azo dyes
1-Naphthols
2-Naphthols
Nitronaphthalenes
Naphthalenesulfonates
Organic sodium salts